Mattat is a small community settlement in northern Israel. Located near the Lebanese Border between the cities of Ma'alot-Tarshiha and Safed, it falls under the jurisdiction of Ma'ale Yosef Regional Council.

History
The village was founded in 1979 by a group of families from an organisation called HaSukah, and was the first settlement of the "Lookouts in the Galilee" plan. It is located on the land of the Palestinian  villages of Dayr al-Qassi and Al-Mansura, both depopulated in the 1948 Arab–Israeli War.

Today many of its residents are employed in local industry and agriculture. Tourism is also an important source of income, and Mattat's scenic setting is featured by several small hotels.

Mattat's name is equivalent in gematria to 840, its altitude in metres. The high location and mountainous region provides the town with a relatively temperate climate. Summer temperatures rarely break 30°C and humidity is low, and summer nights are even chilly. The winters are cold and wet, with an average of over 800mm precipitation, including the occasional snow.

References

Community settlements
Populated places established in 1979
Populated places in Northern District (Israel)
1979 establishments in Israel